Caballo prieto azabache (La tumba de Villa) is a 1968 Mexican historical drama film starring Antonio Aguilar, Flor Silvestre, and Jaime Fernández. It focuses on a horse breeder named Jesús who is set on buying a horse known as "Caballo prieto" (dark horse) and pursuing a relationship with a singer named Genoveva Alarios. With he and Genoveva eventually recruited as spies for the revolutionary leader Pancho Villa. The film was successful at the box-office and stayed in theaters for a surprising nine weeks.

Cast
Antonio Aguilar as Jesús Aguilar
Flor Silvestre as Genoveva Larios
Jaime Fernández as Rodolfo Fierro
Jorge Russek as El Coyote
Jessica Munguía as Martina Arango
Guillermo Rivas as Daniel
Tito Novaro as Colonel Jiménez
José Luis Moreno as Hipólito Arango
José Eduardo Pérez as Juan
Pascual García Peña as Old Townsman
Victorio Blanco as General Velasco
Víctor Velázquez as Emeterio Leyva
José Luis Fernández as Jacinto 
Alejandro Reyna as Plácido López 
Raúl Padilla as Pancho Villa (uncredited)
Francisco Salinas Cortes as Background Actor (uncredited)

References

External links
 

1968 films
Mexican historical drama films
1960s Spanish-language films
Mexican Revolution films
1960s Mexican films